In crystallography, a crystallographic point group is a set of symmetry operations, corresponding to one of the point groups in three dimensions, such that each operation (perhaps followed by a translation) would leave the structure of a crystal unchanged i.e. the same kinds of atoms would be placed in similar positions as before the transformation. For example, in many crystals in the cubic crystal system, a rotation of the unit cell by 90 degrees around an axis that is perpendicular to one of the faces of the cube is a symmetry operation that moves each atom to the location of another atom of the same kind, leaving the overall structure of the crystal unaffected.

In the classification of crystals, each point group defines a so-called (geometric) crystal class. There are infinitely many three-dimensional point groups. However, the crystallographic restriction on the general point groups results in there being only 32 crystallographic point groups. These 32 point groups are one-and-the-same as the 32 types of morphological (external) crystalline symmetries derived in 1830 by Johann Friedrich Christian Hessel from a consideration of observed crystal forms. 

The point group of a crystal determines, among other things, the directional variation of physical properties that arise from its structure, including optical properties such as birefringency, or electro-optical features such as the Pockels effect. For a periodic crystal (as opposed to a quasicrystal), the group must maintain the three-dimensional translational symmetry that defines crystallinity.

Notation

The point groups are named according to their component symmetries. There are several standard notations used by crystallographers, mineralogists, and physicists.

For the correspondence of the two systems below, see crystal system.

Schoenflies notation

In Schoenflies notation, point groups are denoted by a letter symbol with a subscript. The symbols used in crystallography mean the following:

Cn (for cyclic) indicates that the group has an n-fold rotation axis. Cnh is Cn with the addition of a mirror (reflection) plane perpendicular to the axis of rotation. Cnv is Cn with the addition of n mirror planes parallel to the axis of rotation.
S2n (for Spiegel, German for mirror) denotes a group with only a 2n-fold rotation-reflection axis.
Dn (for dihedral, or two-sided) indicates that the group has an n-fold rotation axis plus n twofold axes perpendicular to that axis. Dnh has, in addition, a mirror plane perpendicular to the n-fold axis. Dnd has, in addition to the elements of Dn, mirror planes parallel to the n-fold axis.
The letter T (for tetrahedron) indicates that the group has the symmetry of a tetrahedron. Td includes improper rotation operations, T excludes improper rotation operations, and Th is T with the addition of an inversion.
The letter O (for octahedron) indicates that the group has the symmetry of an octahedron (or cube), with (Oh) or without (O) improper operations (those that change handedness).

Due to the crystallographic restriction theorem, n = 1, 2, 3, 4, or 6 in 2- or 3-dimensional space.

D4d and D6d are actually forbidden because they contain improper rotations with n=8 and 12 respectively. The 27 point groups in the table plus T, Td, Th, O and Oh constitute 32 crystallographic point groups.

Hermann–Mauguin notation

An abbreviated form of the Hermann–Mauguin notation commonly used for space groups also serves to describe crystallographic point groups. Group names are

The correspondence between different notations

Isomorphisms 

Many of the crystallographic point groups share the same internal structure. For example, the point groups , 2, and m contain different geometric symmetry operations, (inversion, rotation, and reflection, respectively) but all share the structure of the cyclic group C2. All isomorphic groups are of the same order, but not all groups of the same order are isomorphic. The point groups which are isomorphic are shown in the following table:

This table makes use of cyclic groups (C1, C2, C3, C4, C6), dihedral groups (D2, D3, D4, D6), one of the alternating groups (A4), and one of the symmetric groups (S4). Here the symbol " × " indicates a direct product.

Deriving the crystallographic point group (crystal class) from the space group

 Leave out the Bravais lattice type.
 Convert all symmetry elements with translational components into their respective symmetry elements without translation symmetry. (Glide planes are converted into simple mirror planes; screw axes are converted into simple axes of rotation.)
 Axes of rotation, rotoinversion axes, and mirror planes remain unchanged.

See also
 Molecular symmetry
 Point group
 Space group
 Point groups in three dimensions
 Crystal system

References

External links
Point-group symbols in International Tables for Crystallography (2006). Vol. A, ch. 12.1, pp. 818-820
Names and symbols of the 32 crystal classes in International Tables for Crystallography (2006). Vol. A, ch. 10.1, p. 794
Pictorial overview of the 32 groups

Symmetry
Crystallography
Discrete groups